The 1998–99 Bulgarian Cup was the 59th season of the Bulgarian Cup. CSKA Sofia won the competition, beating Litex Lovech 1–0 in the final at the Stadion Balgarska Armia in Sofia.

First round
In this round entered winners from the preliminary rounds together with the teams from B Group.

|-
!colspan=3 style="background-color:#D0F0C0;" |13 October 1998

|}

Second round
This round featured winners from the First Round and all teams from A Group. 

|-
!colspan=3 style="background-color:#D0F0C0;" |31 October 1998

|}

Third round

|-
!colspan=5 style="background-color:#D0F0C0;" |28 November / 9 December 1998

|}

Quarter-finals

|-
!colspan=5 style="background-color:#D0F0C0;" |10 March 1999 / 21 April 1999

|}

Semi-finals

|-
!colspan=5 style="background-color:#D0F0C0;" |28 April 1999 / 12 May 1999

|}

Final

Details

References

1998-99
1998–99 domestic association football cups
Cup